Benjamin Willard Adams (March 31, 1890 – March 14, 1961) was an American athlete who competed mainly in the standing jumps. At the 1912 Summer Olympics he won a silver medal in the standing high jump and a bronze in the standing long jump, while his elder brother Platt Adams won a gold and a silver, respectively. Ben also competed in the exhibition baseball tournament for Sweden.

References

1890 births
1961 deaths
American male long jumpers
American male high jumpers
Baseball players from Newark, New Jersey
Track and field athletes from Newark, New Jersey
Olympic baseball players of the United States
Athletes (track and field) at the 1912 Summer Olympics
Baseball players at the 1912 Summer Olympics
Olympic silver medalists for the United States in track and field
Olympic bronze medalists for the United States in track and field
Medalists at the 1912 Summer Olympics